Stepankovo is a rural locality (a village) in Borisoglebskoye Rural Settlement, Muromsky District, Vladimir Oblast, Russia. The population was 518 as of 2010. There are 8 streets.

Geography 
Stepankovo is located 15 km northwest of Murom (the district's administrative centre) by road. Sannikovo is the nearest rural locality.

References 

Rural localities in Muromsky District
Muromsky Uyezd